Kuo-Nan Liou (born 16 November 1944) is a Taiwanese American meteorologist.

Biography
Liou was born in Taiwan on November 16, 1944. After graduating from National Taiwan University in 1965, he pursued advanced studies in the United States, earning his doctor's degree in physics from New York University. He did post-doctoral research at National Aeronautics and Space Administration (NASA). He was a professor at University of Utah since 1975. He joined the faculty of University of California, Los Angeles in 1997 and was promoted to director of Department of Atmospheric and Marine Sciences in 2000. He was elected a fellow of the National Academy of Engineering (NAE)in 1999 and a fellow of the Academia Sinica in 2004. In 2006 he was appointed the first dean of the newly founded Joint Institute for Regional Earth System Science and Engineering. He was elected a foreign member of the Chinese Academy of Sciences on November 28, 2017.

Awards
 1998 Jule G. Charney Award, for his pioneering work in the theory and application of radiative transport and its interaction with clouds.
 2010 William Nordberg Medal
 2013 Roger Revelle Medal
 2018 Carl-Gustaf Rossby Research Medal

References

1944 births
Taiwanese scientists
Living people
National Taiwan University alumni
New York University alumni
Foreign members of the Chinese Academy of Sciences
University of California, Los Angeles faculty
Members of Academia Sinica
American meteorologists
Taiwanese emigrants to the United States